Coronach/Scobey Border Station Airport  is located  southeast of Coronach, Saskatchewan, Canada and  north of Scobey, Montana, United States. In the United States, the airport is known by the names Scobey Border Station Airport and East Poplar International Airport. It is owned by the U.S. and Canadian governments.

The runway lies exactly along the Canada–US border and is adjacent to the Scobey–Coronach Border Crossing between the two aforementioned towns. Customs may be cleared on either side of the border, but customs officials require two hours advance notice prior to landing, and landings are allowed only during the border crossing's normal hours of operation.

The airport is one of six airports that straddle the Canada–US border. The others are Avey Field State Airport, Whetstone International Airport, Coutts/Ross International Airport, International Peace Garden Airport, and Piney Pinecreek Border Airport.

The airport is classified as an airport of entry by Nav Canada and is staffed by the Canada Border Services Agency (CBSA). CBSA officers at this airport currently handle general aviation aircraft only, with no more than fifteen passengers.

Facilities and aircraft 
Canadian records list it as Runway 08/26 while U.S. records refer to it as Runway 7/25. For the 12-month period ending September 9, 2008, the airport had 10 general aviation aircraft operations.

See also 
 List of airports in Saskatchewan
 Scobey–Coronach Border Crossing

References

External links
Page about this airport on COPA's Places to Fly airport directory

 "International Airport Straddles Border." Popular Mechanics, June 1956, p. 133, bottom of page.

Registered aerodromes in Saskatchewan
Airports in Montana
Buildings and structures in Daniels County, Montana
Hart Butte No. 11, Saskatchewan
Transportation in Daniels County, Montana
Binational airports
Canada–United States border